Mohammed Attiqur Rahman (Punjabi), MC (24 June 1918 – 1 June 1996) was a senior general in the Pakistan Army, a noted military historian, and a senior government official. He was the martial law administrator (MLA) of West Pakistan in General Yahya Khan's military regime. He was educated at St.Paul's school, London and joined IMA in 1939 with a sword of Honour and then joined 4th/12th FFR. He was the last Governor of West Pakistan and implemented the dissolution of the One Unit scheme, after which he became the first Governor of Punjab province.

Early life

Born on 24 June 1918, Rahman was the son of Lt Colonel Abdur Rahman, RIAMC. Rahman was schooled at St Paul's in London, UK, and then joined the Prince of Wales Royal Indian Military Academy, Dehradun, British India, where he was awarded the Sword of Honor and the silver spurs as the best all-round Gentleman Cadet.

Military service

Commissioned on 1 February 1940, Rahman joined the 4/12th Frontier Force Regiment ( "Charwanja") and was posted to Thall, Kurram Agency, (Ahmedzai Operations) then to Datta Khel (Lower Tochi Operations). In November 1941, his battalion went to join General Slim's Fourteenth Army to fight in Burma. His best friend in the battalion was Major Sam Manekshaw, later a field marshal, with whom he had a lifelong friendship.

In 1966, promoted to lieutenant general, he commanded his first corps, IV Corps, then headquartered at Multan (later it was moved to Lahore). When General Yahya Khan's martial law was instituted on 25 March 1969, Rahman was appointed Martial Law Administrator (MLA), Zone A (West Pakistan), due to his position as Commander IV  Corps. In August 1969, Rahman was relieved by Tikka Khan and moved to I Corps at Mangla. Rahman stayed there until February 1970. He was then replaced by Lt Gen Irshad Ahmed Khan. Rahman was appointed as the Governor of West Pakistan in February 1970, replacing Air Marshal Nur Khan. He stayed as governor until the breakup of One Unit in 1971, and then became Governor of Punjab. He retired from the army and from the governorship in December 1971.

Military analyst

After retirement in December 1971, he wrote extensively on military issues. In 1977, General Muhammad Zia-ul-Haq appointed him as Chairman of the Federal Public Services Commission, holding this position until 1985.

Awards and decorations

Foreign Decorations

Works

References

External links
Herr Generalfeldmarschall Attiq von Rachmann by Ardeshir Cowasjee (Dawn)

1918 births
1996 deaths
20th-century Pakistani historians
British Indian Army officers
Frontier Force Regiment officers
Generals of the Indo-Pakistani War of 1965
Governors of Punjab, Pakistan
Governors of West Pakistan
Indian Army personnel of World War II
Pakistani generals
Pakistani military historians
People from Rawalpindi District
Punjabi people
Recipients of the Military Cross